A Kingdom for a House or  is a 1949 Dutch comedy film directed by Jaap Speyer. With almost 1.3 million admissions it is one of the most successful Dutch films of all time.

Cast

References

External links 
 

1949 films
Dutch black-and-white films
1949 comedy films
Films directed by Jaap Speyer
Dutch comedy films